Olesya Mamchich, also spelled Mamchych (born 1981) is a Ukrainian poet and children's writer.

Early life and education 
Olesya Mamchich was born in 1981, in Kyiv. She completed studies in creative writing at the Taras Shevchenko National University of Kyiv.

Career 
Olesya Mamchich debuted in 2005. Her poems for children are taught as part of Ukrainian elementary school curriculum. Her works have been translated into English, Polish, Belarusian, Georgian, Romanian, Russian, Lithuanian, Latvian and Hebrew. Her texts inspired songs of the Ukrainian band OY Sound System.

Mamchich organised many poem reading events at the Euromaidan protests. She is a curator of a Ukrainian children's literature award.

Publications

Poetry 

 Перекотиболе, 2005
 Обкладинка, 2014
 Сонце пішло у декрет, 2014

Children's books 

 А на нас упав ананас, 2013
 Тиранозавр Оленка, 2017
 Електромобіль Сашко, 2018
 Хто з’їв мою піжаму?, 2018

References 

Ukrainian women poets
Taras Shevchenko National University of Kyiv alumni
21st-century Ukrainian women writers
Ukrainian children's writers
Poets from Kyiv
1981 births
Living people